Yvonne Elliman is the debut album by American pop music star Yvonne Elliman, recorded and released in 1972 on Decca Records. It was produced by Andrew Lloyd Webber and Tim Rice, for Qwertyuiop Productions, and features the single "I Don't Know How To Love Him".

It also features covers of "Can't Find My Way Home" by Blind Faith, Nothing Rhymed by Raymond O'Sullivan, better known as his stage name, Gilbert O'Sullivan, "World In Changes" and "Look At You, Look At Me" both by Dave Mason, "I Would Have Had A Good Time" by John Kongos, "Speak Your Mind" by Marc Benno and "Sugar Babe" by Stephen Stills.

Track listing
"Look At You, Look at Me" (Dave Mason) 4:12
"I Would Have Had a Good Time" (John Kongos) 4:01
"Can't Find My Way Home" (Steve Winwood) 3:09
"Everyday of My Life" (David Spinozza) 3:50
"I Don't Know How To Love Him" (Tim Rice, Andrew Lloyd Webber) 3:32
"Sugar Babe" (Stephen Stills) 4:19
"Nothing Rhymed" (Gilbert O'Sullivan) 3:36
"World in Changes" (Dave Mason) 3:40
"Interlude for Johnny" (Yvonne Elliman) 2:01
"Speak Your Mind" (Marc Benno) 4:35
"Heat" (Bruce Epstein) 2:53

Personnel
Yvonne Elliman - vocals, acoustic guitar
Hilda Harris, Linda November, Maeretha Stewart - backing vocals
Louis Stewart, Bruce Epstein - acoustic guitar
David Spinozza - acoustic and electric guitar
Hugh McCracken - acoustic and electric guitar, harmonica
Ken Ascher - piano, organ
Peter Gordon - organ
Alan Weighall, Stu Woods - bass
Bruce Rowland - drums
Rick Marotta - drums, percussion
Ralph McDonald - percussion

References

External links
http://www.discogs.com/Yvonne-Elliman-Yvonne-Elliman/master/326506

1972 debut albums
Decca Records albums
albums produced by Tim Rice
albums produced by Andrew Lloyd Webber